Yacaira Tejeda (born 20 August 1992) is a Dominican team handball player. She plays for the club Parque del Este, and on the Dominican Republic national team. She represented Dominican Republic at the 2013 World Women's Handball Championship in Serbia, where Dominican Republic placed 23rd.

References

1992 births
Living people
Dominican Republic female handball players
Expatriate handball players
Dominican Republic expatriate sportspeople in Spain
Pan American Games bronze medalists for the Dominican Republic
Pan American Games medalists in handball
Handball players at the 2007 Pan American Games
Handball players at the 2011 Pan American Games
Medalists at the 2011 Pan American Games